The Herbert Simon Award was established in 2004 by the Rajk László College for Advanced Studies. It is given annually to an outstanding scholar in the field of business and management whose works have contributed to the understanding or solving of practical business problems, and had a substantial influence over a long period of time on the studies and intellectual activity of the students at the college.

This award is given by students, to whom they rated the highest. The students select the nominees and vote for the prize-winner in the Assembly of the college after a review and debate regarding the selected names.

Recipients
The award was given to the following scholars:

References

See also 

 Herbert A. Simon
 Rajk László College for Advanced Studies
 John von Neumann Award

Awards established in 2004
Hungarian awards